Wayne Godfrey Sanstead (born April 16, 1935) served as the North Dakota Superintendent of Public Instruction from 1985 to January 1, 2013, and from 1972 to 1981 as the 31st Lieutenant Governor of North Dakota.

Early life
Sanstead was born in Hot Springs, Arkansas on April 16, 1935 to Godfrey A. and Clara (Buen) Sanstead. Sanstead married Mary Jane Bober on June 16, 1957.   They have two children, Timothy Wayne & Jonathan Paul.

Education
In 1957 Sanstead received his B.A. from St. Olaf College, and in 1967 his Master of Arts in Speech from Northwestern University.  Stanstead earned his doctorate in secondary education from the University of North Dakota.

Political career
Sanstead was the longest serving chief state school officer in the United States. Previously, Sanstead served eight years in the North Dakota House of Representatives (1965–1970), two years in the N.D. Senate (1971–1973), and as the 31st Lieutenant Governor of North Dakota serving under Governor Arthur A. Link (1973–1981).

References

External links
Sanstead biography - North Dakota Department of Public Instruction website

1935 births
Living people
Politicians from Hot Springs, Arkansas
St. Olaf College alumni
Northwestern University alumni
University of North Dakota alumni
Lieutenant Governors of North Dakota
North Dakota Superintendents of Public Instruction
Democratic Party North Dakota state senators
20th-century American politicians
21st-century American politicians
Democratic Party members of the North Dakota House of Representatives